The 1943 UK & Ireland Greyhound Racing Year was the 18th year of greyhound racing in the United Kingdom and Ireland.

Roll of honour

Summary
War time attendances remained strong but there were no known new tracks opened. The only major competitions to take place were again the Scottish Greyhound Derby and Irish Greyhound Derby.

The phenomenon that was a continual growth of attendances and annual totalisator turnover was observed once again, attendances paid £60,382,219 in bets on the totalisator alone. An astonishing figure in 1943, especially taking into account the war.

Ballynennan Moon
Ballynennan Moon continued to be the outstanding performer of the year, he continued where he had left of in 1942 and raced in eighty consecutive weeks of racing. He won the Joe Harmon Memorial Stakes, the Charlton Spring Cup and the Metropolitan Cup.

Competitions
Bilting Hawk won the Scottish Derby and a new puppy called Ballyhennessy Seal, whelped in April 1942, by Lone Seal out of Canadian Glory, arrived at Catford after his two owners had each paid £50 for the puppy. Within two weeks of his arrival he won the 18th Rochester Stakes, his first race in England. Next he was aimed for the Puppy Derby at Wimbledon Stadium where he won his heat by fourteen lengths in 28.88sec, one of the fastest times ever recorded at the track, and was made even-money favourite to win the event outright. He was unlucky to lose the final by a short head to Allardstown Playboy.

Towards the end of the year, the then Wimbledon racing manager, Con Stevens, introduced a special invitation race for puppy champions. The invitees included Allardstown Playboy; Dark Tiger, the Trafalgar Cup; Erlegh Hero, winner of the British Produce Stakes, Model Dasher, the Midland Puppy Derby winner, Fawn Cherry, winner of the Irish Puppy Derby and Ballyhennessy Seal. The latter won the invitation race leading all the way, to win by one and a half lengths in a time of 28.99sec. Blackwater Cutlet won the London Cup at Clapton by twelve lengths from Ballykildare, just one week after they had dead heated in the Stewards Cup at Walthamstow.

The Golden Crest prize money was reduced due to wartime cutbacks.

News
Margaret Hyland became one of the few women trainers to hold a licence joined Rochester Stadium.

Ireland
The Irish Derby would never be run outside of Dublin again which upset the owners of the Irish provincial tracks. The Irish Coursing Club made the decision based on the fact that the capital city offered better facilities and higher prize money. Famous Knight, a red fawn dog started odds on favourite throughout the competition and justified the odds by remaining unbeaten and claiming the final.

Principal races

Totalisator Returns

The totalisator returns declared to the licensing authorities for the year 1943 are listed below. Tracks that did not have a totalisator in operation are not listed.

Summary

References 

Greyhound racing in the United Kingdom
Greyhound racing in the Republic of Ireland
UK and Ireland Greyhound Racing Year
UK and Ireland Greyhound Racing Year
UK and Ireland Greyhound Racing Year
UK and Ireland Greyhound Racing Year